Gavia may refer to:

Gavia (bird), a genus of birds to which the loons belong
Gavia Pass, in the Italian Alps
Monte Gavia, a mountain of Lombardy, Italy
La Gavia, Guanajuato, Mexico, a populated place
USS Gavia (AM-363), a World War II U.S. Navy minesweeper
Gavia gens, an ancient Roman family
La Gavia (Madrid Metro), a metro station